Alysia Reiner  is an American actress. She is best known for playing Natalie "Fig" Figueroa in the Netflix comedy drama series Orange Is the New Black (2013–2019), for which she won a Screen Actors Guild Award for her role as part of the ensemble cast.

Reiner starred in and produced the financial drama Equity, which was bought at Sundance by Sony Pictures Classics and released nationwide. It is now being developed into a TV series by Tri-Star and ABC. Reiner has appeared in several Off-Broadway plays and won an Obie Award for her performance in An Oak Tree. In Sideways, the critically acclaimed comedy–drama film, Reiner played Christine Ergarian, where she won her first ensemble cast SAG award. She played District Attorney Wendy Parks in the ABC crime-legal drama TV series How to Get Away with Murder and Sunny in the FX comedy Better Things.

In 2014, she also appeared in Season 4 of Masters of Sex on Showtime, as Lilian Izikoff on Rosewood, and Trina in Michael Showalter's TBS series Search Party.

Early life
Reiner was born in Gainesville, Florida, in 1970. She graduated from Vassar College and studied acting at the British American Drama Academy and the National Theater Institute at the Eugene O'Neill Theater Center. Reiner is Jewish.

Career

Theatre
She joined Tim Crouch in the Obie Award–winning An Oak Tree at The Barrow Street and Jayson with a Y with The New Group. At The Beckett, she played roles in Anaïs Nin: One of Her Lives and Wasps in Bed.  She has been deemed "Off-Broadway Favorite" by Theatremania and was called "priceless" by The New York Times.

Film and television

Reiner has appeared in several films, including Kissing Jessica Stein, The Vicious Kind, Arranged, Schooled, That Awkward Moment, and 5 Flights Up. In 2004, she played the role of Christine Erganian, Thomas Haden Church's character's fiancée, in the film Sideways, which won Screen Actors Guild Award for Outstanding Performance by a Cast in a Motion Picture. She also had roles in several independent films.

On television, Reiner has appeared on more than 50 shows as series regular, guest star or in recurring roles, including Natalie Figueroa in the Netflix comedy–drama series Orange Is the New Black. In 2014 she joined the cast of ABC legal drama series, How to Get Away with Murder produced by Shonda Rhimes, in a recurring role of D.A. Wendy Parks, a prosecutor who goes up against Viola Davis' character. In 2018 Reiner joined the cast of The Deuce as agent Kiki Rains.

In 2014, Reiner announced that she will be launching Broad Street Pictures to produce films with strong female roles.

Personal life

Reiner has been married to actor David Alan Basche since 1997. The couple have a daughter, Livia, and reside in Harlem, New York City. 

Reiner is involved with many nonprofit organizations and charities, including the Cancer Support Community, Actors for Autism, PEN International, SAY: The Stuttering Association for the Young, Bent on Learning, Safe Kids Worldwide, The Young Women's Leadership Network, Amnesty International,  Cool Effect, and Election Defenders.

Filmography

Film

Television

References

External links

American film actresses
Jewish American actresses
American stage actresses
American television actresses
Actresses from Gainesville, Florida
Living people
20th-century American actresses
21st-century American actresses
Vassar College alumni
21st-century American Jews
Year of birth missing (living people)